Missamma is a 2003 Indian Telugu-language film written and directed by Neelakanta. The film stars Bhumika as the title character alongside Sivaji and Laya. The film won four Nandi Awards including the Best Feature Film. It was remade in Kannada as Namaste Madam in 2014.

Plot
Nanda Gopal, an efficient professional, works for a business corporation; to gain a promotion, he tries to impress his boss, Meghana, but ends up losing his job; Meghana promises Nanda Gopal that she will retain him if he passes few tests.

Cast
Bhumika as Meghana "Missamma"
Sivaji as Nanda Gopal
Laya as Ratna Mala
Sarath Babu as Meghana's uncle
Tanikella Bharani as Nanda Gopal's neighbor
L. B. Sriram as Ratnamala's father
M. S. Narayana as Office staff
Anshu in a Guest appearance

Music
The music director for the film is Vandemataram Srinivas.

Awards
Nandi Awards
Best Feature Film - Gold – B Satyanarayana
Best Actress – Bhumika
Best Screenplay Writer – Neelakanta
Best Female Dubbing Artist – Savitha Reddy (for Bhumika)

References

External links
 

2003 films
Telugu films remade in other languages
2000s Telugu-language films
Films scored by Vandemataram Srinivas